Shigemi (written: 茂巳 or 繁美) is a masculine Japanese given name. Notable people with the name include:

, Japanese scholar
, Japanese footballer
, Japanese sport shooter
, Japanese rower

See also
7597 Shigemi, a main-belt asteroid

Japanese masculine given names